Brit Bildøen (born 28 January 1962) is a Norwegian poet, novelist, essayist, children's writer and literary critic. She was born in Ålesund. She made her literary debut in 1991 with the poetry collection Bilde av menn. Her first novel, Eit anna eple, was published in 1992. 
In 1998 she was awarded the Nynorsk Literature Prize.

References

1962 births
Living people
People from Ålesund
20th-century Norwegian poets
20th-century Norwegian novelists
21st-century Norwegian novelists
Norwegian essayists
Norwegian women essayists
Norwegian children's writers
Norwegian literary critics
Women literary critics
Norwegian women critics
Norwegian women non-fiction writers
Norwegian women novelists
Norwegian women children's writers
Norwegian women poets
21st-century Norwegian women writers
20th-century Norwegian women writers
20th-century essayists
21st-century essayists